Psychotria dura is a species of flowering plant in the family Rubiaceae. It is endemic to Jamaica.

References

dura
Endemic flora of Jamaica
Taxonomy articles created by Polbot
Taxobox binomials not recognized by IUCN